State Route 524 (SR 524) is a suburban state highway in the U.S. state of Washington, located entirely within Snohomish County. The road also has two spur routes, one connecting to SR 104 in Edmonds and another connecting to I-5 in Lynnwood.

A final extension east to SR 522 was completed in 1991.

Route description

SR 524 begins near the east end of the Edmonds ferry terminal at an intersection with SR 104 (Sunset Avenue), which continues west onto the Kingston ferry. The junction is at the head of the ferry terminal's queuing lanes and is northeast of the city's train station. From the intersection, SR 524 travels southeast on Main Street for two blocks and turns north onto 3rd Avenue, away from the center of downtown Edmonds. A spur route travels south on 3rd Avenue towards the ferry terminal's queuing lanes. The highway continues northeast through the primarily residential neighborhood west of Shell Creek and passes the Edmonds Center For the Arts. It then turns east onto Caspers Street, which crosses the creek and turns north onto 9th Avenue and east onto Puget Drive. Puget Drive continues through the center of Maplewood Park and becomes 196th Street Southwest, widening into an urban arterial street near Perrinville.

196th Street crosses into Lynnwood at 76th Avenue and passes to the north of a municipal golf course and the Edmonds College campus. SR 524 intersects SR 99 at the center of Lynnwood, surrounded by several strip malls and retailers. The highway continues east, with a brief bend to the north around Scriber Lake, and intersects another spur route at 44th Avenue West to the south of Lynnwood's civic center complex. The spur route travels south to Lynnwood Transit Center and an interchange with I-5. SR 524 continues east through Lynnwood's city center and intersects I-5 with a partial cloverleaf interchange near the Lynnwood Convention Center and Alderwood Mall.

East of the interchange, SR 524 passes a few more blocks of big-box stores and a light industrial cluster before making a J-turn onto Filbert Road in the Swamp Creek canyon. The highway crosses under I-405 and over the creek in Alderwood Manor, at the bottom of Lynnwood's main hill. It follows I-405 through the North Creek area, traveling southeast until it reaches 208th Street Southeast in Bothell. SR 524 then intersects SR 527 at Thrashers Corner and climbs a hill on Maltby Road, which it follows as the suburban subdivisions give way to rural Snohomish County. The highway descends from the hill and intersects SR 9 at Turner Corner before continuing due east into the Maltby industrial area. SR 524 travels along the north side of the industrial park and crosses a set of railroad tracks before it turns south onto Yew Way and east onto Paradise Lake Road. The highway terminates at an at-grade intersection with SR 522, which continues southwest towards Woodinville as a freeway and northeast towards Monroe as a two-lane expressway.

SR 524 is primarily maintained by the Washington State Department of Transportation (WSDOT), which conducts an annual survey of state routes to measure traffic volume in terms of average annual daily traffic. Average traffic volumes on the highway range from a minimum of 3,300 vehicles at its western terminus in Edmonds to a maximum of 34,000 vehicles at its interchange with I-5 in Lynnwood. The Edmonds–Lynnwood section of SR 524 and both of its spur routes are designated as MAP-21 arterial routes under the National Highway System, a network of roads identified as important to the national economy, defense, and mobility.

History

The first segment of SR 524 to appear on a map was the Edmonds–Scriber Lake section, which was on an 1895 map of the area. It later became part of the North Trunk Road, which connected Everett to Seattle in the 1920s.

Edmonds and Lynnwood boosters sought a state designation for the Edmonds–Lynnwood highway in the early 1950s, citing its use by ferry travelers. SSH 1W was extended east to PSH 1 in Lynnwood by the state legislature in 1957. The designation was extended further east to  near Bothell in 1959, provided that a new road was built in the corridor by the state. During the 1964 highway renumbering, PSH 1 became  (I-5), SSH 1W became  and SR 524 and SSH 2J became SR 527.

In October 2005, the Washington State Department of Transportation (WSDOT) repaved and added safety features to a segment extending from I-5 in Lynnwood to Richmond Road near Bothell. WSDOT has also installed a pair of roundabouts on both sides of the I-405 underpass to handle increasing commuter traffic, with further unfunded plans to widen the roadway. The Lynnwood city government began widening a section of 196th Street Southwest between SR 99 and I-5 in 2021 to accommodate a business access and transit lane as well as a wider median; it also plans to connect Poplar Way with 33rd Avenue West across I-5, providing a bridge between Alderwood Mall Boulevard and 196th Street Southwest in addressing congestion at the latter's ramps to and from I-5, with the U.S. Department of Transportation (USDOT) awarding grant funding in 2022.

Spur routes

Edmonds spur

State Route 524 Spur is a  spur route in Edmonds, Washington that connects its parent State Route 524 in the north with State Route 104 in the south.

In the 1970s, after SR 524 and SR 104 already had their routing through Edmonds in place, the Washington State Ferries moved the toll booth and holding area for the Edmonds ferry terminal off the pier and along SR 104.  This made the ferry terminal inaccessible from westbound SR 524.  Thus, a spur route was signed south along Third Avenue and Pine Street to connect with SR 104 and the ferry terminal.

Lynnwood spur

When SR 524 was originally extended to I-5, its interchange was only on the west side of the freeway.  To accommodate traffic going in all directions, an interchange on 44th Ave W was built.  44th then became recognized as a spur of 524 (even though it's not posted anywhere along the road).  Although the spur is no longer needed to make SR 524's interchange with I-5 complete, it remains signed.

Major intersections

References

External links

Highways of Washington State
City of Lynwood Traffic Cameras

524
Transportation in Snohomish County, Washington
Geography of Bothell, Washington